Harfordia harfordii is a species of sea snail, a marine gastropod mollusk in the family Fasciolariidae, the spindle snails, the tulip snails and their allies.

Description
The soft parts of living specimens give off a luminescent pinkish glow.

Distribution
Hope Island, British Columbia to California.

References

External links
 Stearns R.E.C. (1871). Preliminary descriptions of new species of marine Mollusca from the west Coast of North America. Conchological Memoranda, No. VII. 1 page. Privately published
 Callomon P. & Snyder M.A. (2017). A new genus and nine new species in the Fasciolariidae (Gastropoda: Buccinoidea) from southern California and western Mexico. Proceedings of the Academy of Natural Sciences of Philadelphia. 165(1): 55-80

harfordii
Gastropods described in 1871